Tom Kowal (born November 2, 1967 in Vernon, British Columbia), has been a National Hockey League referee since the 1999–2000 NHL season, and wears uniform number 32.

Tom lives in High River, Alberta with his 1 son, 2 daughters, and wife.

Tom had his 1000 career game on January 19, 2017 between The Nashville Predators and The Calgary Flames. Nashville won 4-3

References

1967 births
Living people
National Hockey League officials
Sportspeople from Vernon, British Columbia